Damian Przytuła (born 27 November 1998) is a Polish handball player for MMTS Kwidzyn and the Polish national team
.

Career

National team
He made his debut for the national team on January 3, 2019, in a friendly match against Belarus (28:30) where he scored one goal.

References

1998 births
Living people
Polish male handball players
Sportspeople from Olsztyn